Kristopher Kevon Williams, known professionally as RXK Nephew (formerly DrugRixh Nephew and Rx Nephew), is an American rapper, songwriter and record producer from Rochester, New York. He is known for his prolific musical output and for his collaborations with fellow Rochester rapper Rx Papi.

Early life 
RXK Nephew was raised in Rochester, New York. He was born when his mother was seventeen years old, and raised primarily by his grandmother.

Career 
RXK Nephew is noted for his prolific releases, having released over 400 songs in 2021 alone. Among his most notable releases are the nine-minute song "American Tterroristt" (2020), which received acclaim from critics, and his 2021 studio album Slitherman Activated, which received coverage from media outlets including Pitchfork.

Music 
RXK Nephew is noted for his use of "atypical beats", incorporating influences from techno, house, hip house, and horrorcore. His lyrical content has been said to capture a sense of "omnipresent paranoia [...] undercut by a sadistically absurd sense of humour", juxtaposing imagery of death and violence (often inspired by real events of his life) with absurd punchlines. In addition, his writing is often provocative, at times "flagrantly offensive". For instance, his work contains references to controversial conspiracy theories on subjects such as the COVID-19 vaccine and the election of Joe Biden.

He has frequently been compared by critics to California rapper Lil B, with comparisons drawn between their quantity of output and stream-of-conscious or "off-the-cuff rapping style".

RXK Nephew has made multiple collaborations with fellow Rx collective member Rx Papi. The duo have previously produced music under the name Neph & Pap and released a collaborative EP in 2020 entitled Oh Shit That's Nep & Pap There They Go.

References 

Year of birth missing (living people)
Living people
American rappers
Musicians from Rochester, New York